Multani is a Hindustani classical raga. The newer raga Madhuvanti was inspired by Multani. Multani belongs to Todi Thaat. It is generally sung in the third prahar of the day, that is, around 1 PM to 4 PM.

Re, Ga, Dha  and Ma .

Re and Dha should be weak, and should be included only in Avarohi phrases.

Vadi: Pa

Samvadi:
Sa

Arohana

Avarohana

Pakad

In Avaroh that is in descending order, the Sangati of Madhyama and Gandhara is shown often. This is the characteristics of Rag Multani.

In Aroh, Raga start from Mandra Nishad, just like N S g or N S M g.

As there is Komal Rushabh in this Rag, it is Sandhi prakash rag.

References

External links
  More details about raga Multani
 SRA on Samay and Ragas
 SRA on Ragas and Thaats
 SRA on Raga Multani
 Rajan Parrikar on Multani

Hindustani ragas